Achra is a coastal village in the Sindhudurg district, Maharashtra, India.

Demography
Achra is part of Malvan taluka.

Attractions
Achra Village is known for Shri Rameshwar Temple which is one of the oldest Shiv temple in Maharashtra. Also, Achra has beautiful Achra Bandar beach.
The beach in Pirawadi is a virgin beach. Zamdul is an island.

Notable people
Padmashri M.R. Acharekar, an artist and film director.
Achyut Kanvinde Padmashri (1974) winner architect.

References

External links
Geographical and Cultural Information About Achra
Map And Travel Information About Achra

Villages in Sindhudurg district